Khalifa Al Saadi (Arabic:خليفة السعدي) (born 23 September 1997) is an Emirati professional footballer who plays as a midfielder for Al-Fujairah.

Career
Al Saadi started his career at Al-Fujairah and is a product of the Al-Fujairah's youth system. On 14 March 2020, Al Saadi made his professional debut for Al-Fujairah against Al-Sharjah in the Pro League, replacing Ernest Asante .

Career statistics

Club

References

External links
 

1997 births
Living people
Emirati footballers
Fujairah FC players
UAE Pro League players
UAE First Division League players
Association football midfielders
Place of birth missing (living people)